Bucculatrix domicola is a moth in the family Bucculatricidae. It is found in North America, where it has been recorded from Ohio and New Jersey. It was first described in 1963 by Annette Frances Braun.

The wingspan is 7.0-7.5 mm. 

The larvae feed on Quercus palustris and Quercus shumardii. They mine the leaves of their host plants.

References

Natural History Museum Lepidoptera generic names catalog

Bucculatricidae
Moths described in 1963
Moths of North America
Taxa named by Annette Frances Braun